is the 19th single by Japanese entertainer Miho Nakayama. Written by Gorō Matsui and Hideo Saitō, the single was released on July 11, 1990, by King Records.

Background and release
Like the previous single "Semi-sweet Magic", "Megamitachi no Bōken" was used by Kyōwa Saitama Bank for their commercial featuring Nakayama. The song was composed and arranged by Saitō, who is best known for his collaborations with Chisato Moritaka.

The B-side is a remix of "Too Fast, Too Close", an English-language song originally from Nakayama's 1988 album Angel Hearts.

"Megamitachi no Bōken" became Nakayama's second straight No. 3 on Oricon's weekly singles chart and sold over 119,000 copies.

Track listing

Charts

References

External links

1990 singles
1990 songs
Japanese-language songs
Miho Nakayama songs
Songs with lyrics by Gorō Matsui
Songs with music by Hideo Saitō (musician, born 1958)
King Records (Japan) singles